Dimapur is the largest city in the Indian state of Nagaland. As of 2011, the municipality had a population of 122,834. The city is the main gateway and commercial centre of Nagaland. Located near the border with Assam along the banks of the Dhansiri River. Its main railway station is the second busiest station in Northeast India.

Etymology
The name Dimapur is derived from the Dimasa words; Di means "water", ma means "large" and pur (sanskrit word) means "city", translating to "Big-river-city", associated with the meaning of "Kachari" which is "people of the river valley" and after the river which flows through it (Dhansiri).

There are two accounts of the way in which Dimapur got its name: many writers are of the opinion that the name 'Dimapur' was derived from Dimasa Kachari words Di-meaning water, Ma-meaning big and Pur-meaning city or township in the Dimasa dialect; while others contend that Dimapur is a corruption of Hidimbapur, meaning the city of Hidimbi (of Mahabharata fame) - the rakshasi-turned-woman whose marriage to the Pandava prince Bhima led to the birth of Ghatotkacha, which was the Hindu lineage created for Dimasa rulers by the Brahmin pandits at Khaspur. According to the second theory, the name Hidimbapur is conjectured to have been abbreviated to Dimbapur and subsequently to have lost a consonant to become Dimapur. It is to be noted that Dimasa Kachari Kingdom was at one point of time names as "Heramba Kingdom" In the Ahom Chronicles, Dimapur Is referred to sometimes as Che-din-chi-pen (town-earth-burn-make) meaning ‘brick town’ and its rulers as Timisa (distorted word for Dimasa).

History
Situated on the banks of the Dhansiri (originally known as Dong-siri meaning a ravine of peaceful habitation), Dimapur was described as the 'Brick City' by the European scholars and by the Ahoms.

Medieval period
In the 13th century, the city was the capital of the Dimasa Kingdom, which was once a powerful and predominant state in the now North East India (Brahmaputra/Dilao Valley). In the heart of the city there is an old relic of the Dimasa Kachari Kingdom which speaks about the once prosperous era.

The city of Dimapur is said to have been founded by a Kachari king Mahamanipha (1330 and 1370 A.D.) and it remained as the capital of the Kacharis until it was captured by the Ahoms in 1536 A.D.

20th century

World War II 
During World War II, Dimapur was the centre of action between British India and Imperial Japan. It was the staging post for the Allied offensive. The Japanese could reach Kohima where a siege was laid. Allied reinforcement came through Dimapur by rail and road for the push against the Japanese. An airport at Dimapur was also in use for supplies to the allied forces in Burma. The battle for Kohima about 77 km from Dimapur is considered the turning point for the Japanese retreat from South East Asia.

Assam lease Dimapur to Nagaland 
In 1918, Dimapur was leased to then Naga Hills District (Now Nagaland) by then erstwhile Assam Province of British of India for 30 years for construction of Railways lines (unclear from which district). In 1963, it was again leased to now state of Nagaland for 99 years. There is controversy surrounding this claim, as both state governments have not come forward to comment on the matter.

21st century

2004 Dimapur bombings 

On 2 October 2004, two powerful bombs were set off—one at the Dimapur Railway Station and the other at the Hong Kong Market killing 30 and injuring over 100 others.

Geography 
Dimapur is located in the southwest of Nagaland. The vast majority of this area is flat with the Dhansiri River, a tributary of the Brahmaputra River flowing east of the city.

Climate
Dimapur is hot and humid in summers and moderately cold in winters.

Demographics
According to the 2011 census, the city-population of the old Town Committee area (up to the old dhansiri bridge) at 122,834. Males constitute 52% of the population and females 48%. Dimapur has an average literacy rate of 86% male literacy is 88% and, female literacy is 84%. In Dimapur, 12% of the population is under 6 years of age.
Unlike other places in the state, this city has a heterogeneous mix of people from all over India, and for which it is also known as "Mini India".

Besides the dominant Naga ethnic groups, who comprise about 50% of the city's population, other prominent groups include Bengalis, Assamese, Oriyas, Nepalese, Biharis, Meiteis, Marwaris, Punjabis and also Tamils, Telugus and Keralites. In the last two decades Tibetan traders have also settled in the city.

Religion

Christianity is the most followed religion in the city making up 45.10% of the city's population, closely followed by Hinduism at 41.11%. 
Islam is followed by 11.21%, Jainism by 1.73%, Buddhist by 0.48% and Sikhs by 0.19%  respectively.

Tourism

Religious and historical sites
Ruins of Kachari Rajbari

Although is left in ruins after centuries of abandonment, after facing conflict with the Ahom King in 18th century and with the settlement of township occupying almost half of its former glorious fortress, is still a national heritage site. It signifies great historical importance for the region of North-East. It also gives great value to the state of Nagaland.

Dimapur City Tower 
The Dimapur City Tower is a major landmark of the city. It is located at Circular Road in the heart of Dimapur. Also known as the Clock Tower, the tower is decorated with Christmas Lights during the Christmas season.

Dimapur Jain Temple

The Dimapur Jain Temple was built in 1947. The temple has some intricate glass work. The temple is considered very auspicious by the people of Dimapur. The temple was built by the tireless effort of Shri Jethmal Sethi, Shri Phulchand Sethi, Shri Udayram Chabra, Shri Chunnilal Kishanlal Sethi, Shri Kanhaiyal Sethi, Shri Mangilal Chabra, Motilal Patni, Subhkaran Sethi and other Jain families present in Dimapur at that time.

Parks and other highlights
Dimapur has several places where tourist can visit such as Nagaland Science Center, Stone Park, Hazi Park, Shiv Mandir and Kali Temple. The Nagaland Zoological Park, Green Park, Niathu Resort, Noune Resort, The Triple Falls, Nagaland Science Centre, Aqua Mellow Park and Agri Expo site in the neighbouring Chümoukedima District can be easily accessible from Dimapur.

Transportation

Airport

Dimapur is served by the Dimapur Airport located at 3rd Mile (AH1), Chümoukedima District. It is the only civil airport in the state and operates routes to Kolkata,
Guwahati, Imphal, and Dibrugarh. 

There are plans for expansion of the airport to meet international norms by buying land at Aoyimti village.

Roadways

Highways passing through Dimapur
  Asian Highway 1
  Asian Highway 2
 : National Highway 29 (India)
 : National Highway 129 (India)
: National Highway 129A (India)

Railway

Dimapur has direct train services to cities like Guwahati, Kolkata, Patna,  New Delhi, Bangalore, Chandigarh, Amritsar, Dibrugarh and Chennai from the Dimapur railway station. The station is categorised as an A category railway station which lies on the Lumding-Dibrugarh section under the Lumding railway division of Northeast Frontier Railway.

Sports
The Dimapur District Sports Council Stadium is multi-purpose sports stadium in the city while the Nagaland State Stadium is another multi-disciplinary sports stadium currently under construction.

Economy

Dimapur is the commercial centre of Nagaland. It also acts as a transit hub for trading goods brought in from trains at Dimapur railway station and by road via National Highway 29 to other parts of Nagaland. Many private and central banks are also located in the city. Some major hotels are Hotel Acacia (3-star hotel), Hotel Saramati, Hotel Lake Shiloi among many others.

Commerce
A number of shopping centers and markets have sprung up in Dimapur, with the HongKong Market, Central Plaza, New Market, Bank colony (Super Market Area) and Circular and NL roads serving as the main commercial areas in the city. The Complexes and shopping centres have sprung up to Notun Bosti.

The stretch from Purana Bazaar to Chümoukedima along the AH-1 is also rapidly developing into commercial areas.

The city's Hong Kong Market is well known for imported goods from Thailand, China, and Burma and is the main Shopping Attraction for Tourists visiting Nagaland. The wholesale foodgrain items are available at KL Sethi Market Complex, Jasokie Market, etc. at GS Road, Dimapur.

The Agro & Food Processing Special Economic Zone (AFSEZ) at Ganeshnagar under Dimapur District in Nagaland is one of the few exclusive Agro Food Products SEZ in India. It is developed by state-run Nagaland Industrial Development Corporation Limited.

Education

Colleges
Dimapur Government College
Public College of Commerce
Salesian College of Higher Education
Sakus Mission College
Trinity Theological College
Unity College
Pranabananda Women's College
Cornerstone College
Ngullie Memorial College
School of Engineering & Technology, Nagaland University
Yemhi Memorial College
St. John College

Schools
Delhi Public School
Assembly Of God Higher Secondary School
Don Bosco Higher Secondary School
Greenwood School
Holy Cross School
Little Star Higher Secondary School
Living Stone Foundation Higher Secondary School
N. N. Nagi School
Pranab Vidyapith Higher Secondary School
St. John Higher Secondary Residential School
King David School, Kushiabill

Notable people 
 Kevichüsa Angami (1903–1990), Politician
 Zhokhoi Chüzho, Actor
 Zuboni Hümtsoe (1990–2017), Entrepreneur
 Chalie Kevichüsa (1943–1992), Journalist
 Razhukhrielie Kevichüsa (1941–2022), Bureaucrat and Musician
 Tubu Kevichüsa (1948–1996), Nationalist Leader
 Alobo Naga, Musician
 Phulchand Sethi (1911–1976), Businessperson
 Kihoto Hollohon Yepthomi (1932–2021), Politician

See also
 Chümoukedima

References

External links

 Official district link
 My Dimapur, city portal
 Satellite map of Dimapur

 
Cities and towns in Dimapur district